Tikhaya Sosna is a river in Belgorod and Voronezh oblasts of Russia. It is a right tributary of the river Don.

The river has its sources in the eastern part of Belgorod Oblast, on the southeastern slopes of the Central Russian Upland.

Along the Tikhaya Sosna lie the towns of Biryuch, Alexeyevka and Ostrogozhsk.

References

Rivers of Belgorod Oblast
Rivers of Voronezh Oblast